Nizam's Institute of Medical Sciences (NIMS) is a public hospital located in Hyderabad, Telangana, India and is named after its founder – the 7th Nizam of Hyderabad– and was inaugurated by Princess Durreshehvar 
It is an Institute under State Legislature Act under the Act of Andhra Pradesh State Legislature. It has a big sprawling campus in Punjagutta.

Overview
NIMS is recognized by Medical Council of India. It is administered under the supervision of the Governing Council, Executive Board, Director and other statutory bodies.

It publishes the monthly journal "The Clinical Proceedings of Nizam's Institute of Medical Sciences" for the last 20 years.

History

The Nizam's Orthopaedic Hospital was inaugurated by Sri S. K. Patil, Union Minister for Railways on 22 December 1964. The first Superintendent of the hospital was M. Ranga Reddy, a well known Orthopedic Surgeon, who convinced the 7th Nizam to build a specialty hospital for Orthopedics and played an important role in its construction.  The hospital was under the H.E.H. the Nizam's Charitable Trust until it was handed over to AP Government.  Dr. Ranga Reddy was the administrator of the hospital also till then.

Academics
The institute conducts MD, MS, M. Ch, D.M, Ph.D courses in about 40 disciplines that are recognized by Medical Council of India and issues certificates. Apart from this, there are various paramedical post graduate diploma courses being conducted by the institute.

Notable alumni
Sree Bhushan Raju

Notable faculty
 B. Somaraju, eminent cardiologist
 D. Prasada Rao, cardiothorasic surgeon, Padma Shri awardee
 Kakarla Subba Rao, eminent radiologist
 Lavu Narendranath, orthopedic surgeon, Padma Shri awardee
 Undurti Narasimha Das, clinical immunologist, endocrinologist and the founder president and chief executive officer of UND Life Sciences

See also
 :Category:Establishments in Hyderabad State

References

External links

 Official website of NIMS

Institute under State Legislature Act
Medical and health sciences universities in India
Universities and colleges in Hyderabad, India
Healthcare in Hyderabad, India
Hospitals established in Hyderabad State
1961 establishments in Andhra Pradesh
State universities in Telangana
Hospitals established in 1961